H.E. Francis Nyamu Kagwima is a Kenyan politician, born in 1952. He is the second and incumbent Deputy Governor of Tharaka Nithi County in Kenya after having been cleared on a Jubilee Party in the Kenyan election as Onesmus Muthomi Njuki's running mate. Before being elected the Deputy Governor, he served as a Member of Parliament of Tharaka Constituency for the terms in 1988–1997 and re-elected again in 2002–2007.

Education background 
After completing his early education, he joined Tharaka Boys from 1969–1970, did KJSE and later joined Nkubu High School from 1971–1974 for his O level and A level. He joined Nairobi University in 1975 where he pursued his Bachelor of Science in mechanical engineering.

He graduated in 1978 with Upper Class Honours.

Career life 
After graduating from University he joined KPCU as an Engineer trainee and rose quickly to the rank of Chief Engineer until he resigned to join politics in 1988.  

He was elected as a Member of Parliament for Tharaka Constituency in 1988.  

In his second term he was an Assistant Minister in Research, Technical Training & Technology from 1993–1997.

References

Living people
1952 births
Date of birth missing (living people)
Place of birth missing (living people)
Jubilee Party politicians
Members of the National Assembly (Kenya)
University of Nairobi alumni
Kenyan engineers